The Russia women's national basketball team is administered by the Russian Basketball Federation.
The team  has participated in four FIBA Women's World Cups and their best finish has been a silver medal in 1998, 2002 and 2006. In European Women Basketball Championship the Russian team won gold medals in 2003, 2007 and 2011, silver medals in 2001, 2005 and 2009, and bronze in 1995 and 1999. They have participated in five Olympic Games, winning two bronze medals.

After the 2022 Russian invasion of Ukraine, FIBA banned Russian teams and officials from participating in FIBA 3x3 Basketball competitions.

Competition records

Current roster
Roster for the EuroBasket Women 2021.

See also
Russia women's national under-19 basketball team
Russia women's national under-17 basketball team
Russia women's national 3x3 team
Soviet Union women's national basketball team

References

External links
 
FIBA profile
Archived records of Russia team participations

 
Women's national basketball teams